Love in the Big City 2 is a 2010 romantic comedy film directed by Maryus Vaysberg. This is the second film of a trilogy about the adventures of three friends in search of true love. This film is a project by Kvartal 95 Studio.

In 2018 the film was banned in Ukraine for "non-compliance with the provisions of the Law on Cinematography."

Plot
The film begins in Thailand, on the ranch of Igor's father, and continues in Moscow. Igor invites friends to the ranch to introduce Nastya to his father and have a good time. On the way to the plane the friends get acquainted with a young American family that is going to one of the monasteries to recover from infertility. Igor, Artem and Sauna try to dissuade their girlfriends from visiting the monastery, but without success. In the monastery an ancient idol is located, which according to legend, grants paternity to anyone who touches it. Despite the monk's warning, the friends still make physical contact with the idol and are now doomed to conceive a child at the first sexual intercourse. Afraid of this, they temporarily decide to refrain from sex, which causes discontent of their sweethearts, who become offended and leave. Igor's situation is aggravated by the fact that his father is an oligarch against his relationship with Nastya and wants to arrange a profitable marriage for him in order to fix his financial affairs, and Nastya learns about this with all the ensuing consequences. The guys decide to spend the rest of their time in leisure, but then they meet their old friend — Saint Valentine, who puts a new spell on them — only one of them will become a father, and the rest will be able to have a child no earlier than in 10 years. The guys realize that they are ready for paternity, and adventures begin.

Cast
Aleksey Chadov — Artem
Volodymyr Zelenskyy — Igor
Ville Haapasalo — Oleg "Sauna"
Vera Brezhneva — Katya
Svetlana Khodchenkova — Nastya Korshun
Anastasia Zadorozhnaya — Alisa Gromova
Leonid Yarmolnik — father of Igor
Igor Vernik — director of the dental clinic
Philipp Kirkorov — Buddhist monk (Saint Valentine)
Pavel Volya — taxi driver Hamlet
Anastasia Stotskaya — Vika (cameo appearance)
Igor Jijikine — Oleg
Pavel Derevyanko — guard of the sports building
Mikhail Yefremov — coach
Ravshana Kurkova — Elena
Evelina Bledans — Irina Sergeevna
Aleksandr Loye — assistant duty officer for internal affairs
Olga Zinkovskaya — client of Nastia
Spartak Sumchenko — Oleg's classmate
Sergei Friends — Patient Anastasia Igorevny
Evgeny Koshevoi — guest worker

Production
The film was produced as the second part of a trilogy in Bangkok, Thailand.

References

External links

 IMDB - Lyubov v bolshom gorode 2
 YouTube - Official trailer
 Kvartal 95 Studio - Кохання у великому місті 2

Ukrainian romantic comedy films
Russian romantic comedy films
2010 romantic comedy films
2010 films
Films directed by Maryus Vaysberg
Films set in Moscow
Films set in Thailand
Films shot in Thailand
Films shot in Moscow
Russian sex comedy films
2010s sex comedy films
Slapstick films
Volodymyr Zelenskyy films